Franz Schubert's compositions of 1820 are mostly in the Deutsch catalogue (D) range D 679–708, and include:
 Instrumental works:
 Quartettsatz, D 703
 Vocal music:
 Lazarus, D 689
 Sakuntala, D 701

Table

Legend

List

|-
| 681
| 681
| data-sort-value="XXX,1930" | (1930)
| data-sort-value="ZZZZ" |
| data-sort-value="726,00" | VII/2, 6
| data-sort-value="Landler, 12, D 681" | Twelve Ländler, D 681
| data-sort-value="key I" | Various keys
| data-sort-value="1815-01-01" | 
| For piano; Nos. 1–4 are lost
|-
| 682
| 682
| data-sort-value="XXX,1895" | (1895)
| data-sort-value="2010,599" | XX, 10No. 599
| data-sort-value="412,00" | IV, 12
| data-sort-value="Uber allen Zauber Liebe" | Über allen Zauber Liebe
| data-sort-value="text Sie hupfte mit mir auf grunem Plan" | Sie hüpfte mit mir auf grünem Plan
| data-sort-value="1820-01-01" | 1820–1824
| data-sort-value="Text by Mayrhofer, Johann, Sie hupfte mit mir auf grunem Plan" | Text by Mayrhofer; Fragment
|-
| 683
| data-sort-value="999.0732" | 732
| data-sort-value="ZZZZ" |

| data-sort-value="ZZZZ" |

| data-sort-value="ZZZZ" |

| data-sort-value="Wolkenbraut, Die" | Die Wolkenbraut
| data-sort-value="text Der Jager ruhte hingegossen" | Der Jäger ruhte hingegossen
| data-sort-value="ZZZZ" |

| See  No. 11
|-
| 684
| 684
| data-sort-value="XXX,1850" | (1850)
| data-sort-value="2006,378" | XX, 6No. 378
| data-sort-value="412,00" | IV, 12
| data-sort-value="Sterne, Die, D 684" | Die Sterne, D 684
| data-sort-value="text Du staunest, o Mensch" | Du staunest, o Mensch
| data-sort-value="1820-01-01" | 1820
| data-sort-value="Text by Schlegel, Friedrich von from Abendrote II 08" | Text by Schlegel, F., from Abendröte II, 8
|-
| 685
| 685
| data-sort-value="004,1821-2" | 4,2(1821)
| data-sort-value="2006,379" | XX, 6No. 379
| data-sort-value="401,0042" | IV, 1a
| Morgenlied, D 685
| data-sort-value="text Eh' die Sonne fruh aufersteht" | Eh' die Sonne früh aufersteht
| data-sort-value="1820-01-01" | 1820
| data-sort-value="Text by Werner, Zacharias, Eh' die Sonne fruh aufersteht" | Text by Werner
|-
| 686
| 686
| data-sort-value="020,1823-2" | 20,2(1823)(1970)
| data-sort-value="2006,380" | XX, 6No. 380
| data-sort-value="401,0202" | IV, 1a &b No. 15
| data-sort-value="Fruhlingsglaube" | Frühlingsglaube
| data-sort-value="text Die linden Lufte sind erwacht" | Die linden Lüfte sind erwacht
| data-sort-value="1822-11-01" | Sep. 1820–Nov. 1822
| data-sort-value="Text by Uhland, Ludwig, Die linden Lufte sind erwacht" | Text by Uhland; Three versions: 3rd, in AGA, is Op. 20 No. 2
|-
| 687
| 687
| data-sort-value="XXX,1872" | (1872)
| data-sort-value="2006,372" | XX, 6No. 372
| data-sort-value="412,00" | IV, 12
| Nachthymne
| data-sort-value="text Hinuber wall' ich" | Hinüber wall' ich
| data-sort-value="1820-01-01" | January1820
| data-sort-value="Text by Novalis, Hinuber wall' ich" | Text by Novalis
|-
| 688
| 688
| data-sort-value="XXX,1871" | (1871)
| data-sort-value="2010,575" | XX, 10Nos.575–578
| data-sort-value="412,00" | IV, 12
| data-sort-value="Canzonen, 4" | Vier Canzonen
| data-sort-value="text Non t'accostar all'urna" | 1. Non t'accostar all'urna – 2. Guarda, che bianca luna – 3. Da quel sembiante appresi – 4. Mio ben, ricordati
| data-sort-value="1820-01-01" | January1820
| data-sort-value="Text by Vittorelli, Iacopo, Non t'accostar all'urna"| Text by Vittorelli (Nos. 1–2) and Metastasio (No. 3 from L'eroe cinese I, 3 – No. 4 from Alessandro nell'Indie III, 7)
|-
| 689
| 689
| data-sort-value="XXX,1865" | (1865)(1892)
| data-sort-value="1700,001" | XVIINo. 1
| data-sort-value="210,00" | II, 10
| Lazarus, oder: Die Feier der Auferstehung
| data-sort-value="theatre (Scenic oratorio in 3 acts)" | (Scenic oratorio in three acts)
| data-sort-value="1820-03-01" | early 1820–Mar. 1820
| data-sort-value="Text by Niemeyer, August Hermann, Lazarus" | Text by Niemeyer; For sssttbSATB and orchestra (piano reduction in 1865 publ.); Unfinished: Nos. 1–21 (Act I) – Nos. 22–29 (Act II)
|-
| 690
| 690
| data-sort-value="XXX,1830" | (1830)
| data-sort-value="2006,376" | XX, 6No. 376
| data-sort-value="412,00" | IV, 12
| data-sort-value="Abendrote" | Abendröte
| data-sort-value="text Tiefer sinket schon die Sonne" | Tiefer sinket schon die Sonne
| data-sort-value="1823-03-01" | March 1823
| data-sort-value="Text by Schlegel, Friedrich von from Abendrote I 00" | Text by Schlegel, F., from Abendröte I
|-
| 691
| 691
| data-sort-value="172,1865-6" | 172p,6(1865)
| data-sort-value="2006,373" | XX, 6No. 373
| data-sort-value="412,00" | IV, 12
| data-sort-value="Vogel, Die" | Die Vögel
| data-sort-value="text Wie lieblich und frohlich" | Wie lieblich und fröhlich
| data-sort-value="1820-03-01" | March 1820
| data-sort-value="Text by Schlegel, Friedrich von from Abendrote I 02" | Text by Schlegel, F., from Abendröte I, 2
|-
| 692
| 692
| data-sort-value="XXX,1872" | (1872)
| data-sort-value="2006,374" | XX, 6No. 374
| data-sort-value="412,00" | IV, 12
| data-sort-value="Knabe, Der" | Der Knabe
| data-sort-value="text Wenn ich nur ein Voglein ware" | Wenn ich nur ein Vöglein wäre
| data-sort-value="1820-03-01" | March 1820
| data-sort-value="Text by Schlegel, Friedrich von from Abendrote I 03" | Text by Schlegel, F., from Abendröte I, 3
|-
| 693
| 693
| data-sort-value="XXX,1872" | (1872)
| data-sort-value="2006,375" | XX, 6No. 375
| data-sort-value="412,00" | IV, 12
| data-sort-value="Fluss, Der" | Der Fluß
| data-sort-value="text Wie rein Gesang sich windet" | Wie rein Gesang sich windet
| data-sort-value="1820-03-01" | March 1820
| data-sort-value="Text by Schlegel, Friedrich von from Abendrote I 04" | Text by Schlegel, F., from Abendröte I, 4
|-
| 694
| 694
| data-sort-value="XXX,1842" | (1842)
| data-sort-value="2006,377" | XX, 6No. 377
| data-sort-value="412,00" | IV, 12
| data-sort-value="Schiffer, Der, D 694" | Der Schiffer, D 694
| data-sort-value="text Friedlich lieg' ich hingegossen" | Friedlich lieg' ich hingegossen
| data-sort-value="1820-03-01" | March 1820
| data-sort-value="Text by Schlegel, Friedrich von, Friedlich lieg' ich hingegossen" | Text by Schlegel, F.
|-
| 695
| 695
| data-sort-value="XXX,1895" | (1895)
| data-sort-value="2010,587" | XX, 10No. 587
| data-sort-value="412,00" | IV, 12
| Namenstagslied
| data-sort-value="text Vater, schenk' mir diese Stunde" | Vater, schenk' mir diese Stunde
| data-sort-value="1820-03-19" | 19/3/1820?
| data-sort-value="Text by Stadler, Albert, Vater, schenk' mir diese Stunde" | Text by 
|-
| 696
| 696
| data-sort-value="113,1829-0" | 113p(1829)
| data-sort-value="1400,018" | XIV No. 18
| data-sort-value="109,011" | I, 9No. 11
| data-sort-value="Antiphonen, 6, zum Palmsonntag" | Sechs Antiphonen zum Palmsonntag
| data-sort-value="text Hosanna filio David" | Hosanna filio David – In monte Oliveti – Sanctus – Pueri Hebraeorum – Cum angelis et pueris – Ingrediente Domino
| data-sort-value="1820-03-26" | 26/3/1820
| For SATB
|-
| 697
| 697
| data-sort-value="018,1823-E6" | 18,É6(1823)(1889)
| data-sort-value="1200,028" | XIINo. 28No. 2,É6
| data-sort-value="726,00" | VII/2, 6
| data-sort-value="Ecossaises, 06, D 697" | Six Écossaises, D 697
| data-sort-value="key A-flat major" | A major
| data-sort-value="1820-05-01" | May 1820
| For piano; No. 5 is 6th Écossaise of Op. 18
|-
| 698
| 698
| data-sort-value="XXX,1832" | (1832)
| data-sort-value="2006,381" | XX, 6No. 381
| data-sort-value="412,00" | IV, 12
| data-sort-value="Frauleins Liebeslauschen, Des" | Des Fräuleins Liebeslauschen
| data-sort-value="text Hier unten steht ein Ritter" | Hier unten steht ein Ritter
| data-sort-value="1820-09-01" | September1820
| data-sort-value="Text by Schlechta, Franz Xaver von, Hier unten steht ein Ritter"| Text by 
|-
| 699
| 699
| data-sort-value="XXX,1831" | (1831)
| data-sort-value="2006,383" | XX, 6No. 383
| data-sort-value="412,00" | IV, 12
| data-sort-value="Entsuhnte Orest, Der" | Der entsühnte Orest
| data-sort-value="text Zu meinen Fussen brichst du dich" | Zu meinen Füßen brichst du dich
| data-sort-value="1820-09-01" | September1820
| data-sort-value="Text by Mayrhofer, Johann, Zu meinen Fussen brichst du dich" | Text by Mayrhofer
|-
| 700
| 700
| data-sort-value="XXX,1831" | (1831)
| data-sort-value="2006,384" | XX, 6No. 384
| data-sort-value="412,00" | IV, 12
| Freiwilliges Versinken
| data-sort-value="text Wohin? o Helios!" | Wohin? o Helios!
| data-sort-value="1820-09-01" | September1820
| data-sort-value="Text by Mayrhofer, Johann, Wohin? o Helios!" | Text by Mayrhofer
|-
| 701
| 701
| data-sort-value="XXX,1929" | (1929)
| data-sort-value="ZZZZ" |
| data-sort-value="215,00" | II, 15
| Sakuntala (also spelled Sacontala or Sakontala)
| data-sort-value="theatre (Opera in 3 acts)" | (Opera in three acts)
| data-sort-value="1820-03-21" | Oct. 1820–spring1821
| data-sort-value="Text by Neumann, Johann Philipp Sakuntala" | Text by Neumann after Kalidasa's Shakuntala; For ssssssttttttbbbbbbSATB and orchestra; Unfinished (all numbers are sketches): Nos. 1–7 (Act I, last pages publ. in 1929) – Nos. 8a–11 (Act II)
|-
| 702
| 702
| data-sort-value="008,1822-1" | 8,1(1822)
| data-sort-value="2006,385" | XX, 6No. 385
| data-sort-value="401,0081" | IV, 1a
| data-sort-value="Jungling auf dem Hugel, Der" | Der Jüngling auf dem Hügel
| data-sort-value="text Ein Jungling auf dem Hugel" | Ein Jüngling auf dem Hügel
| data-sort-value="1820-11-01" | November1820
| data-sort-value="Text by Hüttenbrenner, Heinrich, Ein Jungling auf dem Hugel"| Text by 
|-
| 703
| 703
| data-sort-value="XXX,1870" | (1870)(1897)
| data-sort-value="0500,012" | V No. 12XXII v5
| data-sort-value="605,13" | VI, 5No. 13 & Anh.
| data-sort-value="String Quartet, D 703" | String Quartet No. 12
| data-sort-value="key C minor" | C minor
| data-sort-value="1820-12-01" | December1820
| Allegro assai (a.k.a. Quartettsatz, publ. 1870) – Andante (fragment)
|-
| 704
| data-sort-value="999.0714" | 714
| data-sort-value="ZZZZ" |

| data-sort-value="ZZZZ" |

| data-sort-value="ZZZZ" |

| data-sort-value="ZZZZ" |

| data-sort-value="ZZZZ" |

| data-sort-value="ZZZZ" |

| See 
|-
| 705
| 705
| data-sort-value="XXX,1897" | (1897)
| data-sort-value="2104,034" | XXI, 4No. 34
| data-sort-value="303,75" | III, 3 Anh. II No. 5
| data-sort-value="Gesang der Geister uber den Wassern, D 705" | Gesang der Geister über den Wassern, D 705
| data-sort-value="text Des Menschen Seele gleicht dem Wasser 3" | Des Menschen Seele gleicht dem Wasser
| data-sort-value="1820-12-01" | December1820
| data-sort-value="Text by Goethe, Johann Wolfgang von, Des Menschen Seele gleicht dem Wasser 3" | Text by Goethe (other settings: , 538 and 714); Sketch for ttbb and piano
|-
| 706
| 706
| data-sort-value="132,1832-0" | 132p(1832)
| data-sort-value="1800,002" | XVIIINo. 2
| data-sort-value="303,25" | III, 3 No. 25Anh. III No. 2Anh. IV No. 5
| Psalm 23 (22)
| data-sort-value="text Gott ist mein Hirt, mir wird nichts mangeln" | Gott ist mein Hirt, mir wird nichts mangeln
| data-sort-value="1820-12-01" | December1820
| data-sort-value="Text by Mendelssohn, Moses translating Psalm 23" | Text by Mendelssohn, M., translating Psalm 23; For ssaa and piano
|-
| 707
| 707
| data-sort-value="036,1825-1" | 36,1(1825)(1895)
| data-sort-value="2006,387" | XX, 6No. 387
| data-sort-value="402,0361" | IV, 2a &b No. 4
| data-sort-value="Zurnenden Diana, Der" | Der zürnenden Diana
| data-sort-value="text Ja, spanne nur den Bogen" | Ja, spanne nur den Bogen
| data-sort-value="1820-12-01" | December1820
| data-sort-value="Text by Mayrhofer, Johann, Ja, spanne nur den Bogen" | Text by Mayrhofer; Two versions: 2nd is Op. 36 No. 1
|-
| 708
| 708
| data-sort-value="XXX,1832" | (1832)
| data-sort-value="2006,387" | XX, 6No. 387
| data-sort-value="412,00" | IV, 12
| Im Walde, D 708, a.k.a. Waldesnacht
| data-sort-value="text Windes Rauschen, Gottes Flugel" | Windes Rauschen, Gottes Flügel
| data-sort-value="1820-12-01" | December1820
| data-sort-value="Text by Schlegel, Friedrich von, Windes Rauschen, Gottes Flugel" | Text by Schlegel, F.
|}

Lists of compositions by Franz Schubert
Compositions by Franz Schubert
Schubert